Blastobasis lavernella is a moth in the  family Blastobasidae. It is found on Madeira and in Spain.

The wingspan is 15–16 mm. The forewings are ochreous mixed with reddish-ochreous mottlings and shaded with patches of greyish brown. The hindwings are shining pale stramineous (straw coloured).

References

Moths described in 1894
Blastobasis